Gushti (also Romanized as Gūshtī) is a village in Khorrami Rural District, in the Central District of Khorrambid County, Fars Province, Iran. At the 2006 census, its population was 58, in 17 families.

References 

Populated places in Khorrambid County